Gheyzaniyeh Rural District is a rural district (dehestan) in the Central District of Ahvaz County, Khuzestan Province, Iran. At the 2006 census, its population was 11,636, in 2,066 families.  The rural district has 49 villages.

References 

Rural Districts of Khuzestan Province
Ahvaz County